Paddy Knob is a summit in Virginia and West Virginia, in the United States.

Paddy Knob derives its name from "paddy", which meant "bear" in African American Vernacular English.

References

Mountains of Bath County, Virginia
Mountains of Highland County, Virginia
Mountains of Pocahontas County, West Virginia
Mountains of West Virginia
Mountains of Virginia